Joana Flaviano Aurtenetxe (born 15 February 1990) is a Spanish retired footballer who played as a midfielder. She spent the vast majority of her career with Athletic Bilbao, winning the Spanish league title twice (2006–07 and 2015–16). She also had a season at Torres Calcio of the Italian Serie A.

As an Under-19 international she played the 2007 and 2008 U-19 European Championships. She made a 30-minute substitute appearance for the senior national team in a 0–0 home UEFA Women's Euro 2013 qualifying draw with Romania in September 2012.

Flaviano retired from top level football halfway through the 2017–18 season, aged 27, to pursue other career opportunities.
In 2021 participated in "El conquistador del Caribe"

References

External links
 
 Profile at Athletic Bilbao
 Profile at Football.it 
 Profile at aupaAthletic.com 
 

1990 births
Living people
Spanish women's footballers
Primera División (women) players
Athletic Club Femenino players
Torres Calcio Femminile players
Expatriate women's footballers in Italy
Serie A (women's football) players
Spanish expatriate women's footballers
Spanish expatriate sportspeople in Italy
Footballers from Bilbao
Women's association football midfielders
Spain women's international footballers
Athletic Club Femenino B players
Spain women's youth international footballers